In the statistical analysis of the results from factorial experiments, the sparsity-of-effects principle states that a system is usually dominated by main effects and low-order interactions.  Thus it is most likely that main (single factor) effects and two-factor interactions are the most significant responses in a factorial experiment.  In other words, higher order interactions such as three-factor interactions are very rare.  This is sometimes referred to as the hierarchical ordering principle.  The sparsity-of-effects principle actually refers to the idea that only a few effects in a factorial experiment will be statistically significant.

This principle is only valid on the assumption of a factor space far from a stationary point.

See also
 Occam's Razor
 Pareto principle

References

Design of experiments
Statistical principles